"One Day I'll Fly Away" is a song performed by American jazz singer Randy Crawford, from her fourth studio album, Now We May Begin (1980). The song was written by Joe Sample and Will Jennings and produced by Sample, Wilton Felder and Stix Hooper. It received generally favorable reviews from music critics. The song was a commercial success in the international market at the time, reaching number one in Belgium (Flanders) and Netherlands, while peaking at number two in the United Kingdom.

"One Day I'll Fly Away" is Crawford's highest charting single, and has been covered by many artists, including by Nicole Kidman portraying the character of Satine in the 2001 motion picture Moulin Rouge!. In 2013, Girls Aloud member Kimberley Walsh released a cover of the song as the lead single from her debut studio album, Centre Stage. The song has also been covered by British Electronica trio Vaults which was featured in the John Lewis 2016 Christmas advertisement.

Composition and reception
"One Day I'll Fly Away" was written by Joe Sample and Will Jennings, and produced by Sample, Wilton Felder and Stix Hooper. The main hook (in which the singer sings the title of the song) is itself an interpolation of Tchaikovsky's Waltz of the Flowers from his ballet, The Nutcracker. Jon O'Brien of Allmusic said that the song showcases Crawford's "sumptuous, soulful tones." 

Writing about the singer's life for The Daily Telegraph, critic Helen Brown said that "in the pouty world of the jazz chanteuse, Randy Crawford's smile is unique," adding that "even on the saddest of songs, A Rainy Night in Georgia or One Day I'll Fly Away, you could hear those trembling lips spread outwards and upwards through the tears." "One Day I'll Fly Away" achieved widespread radio airplay and did well in the international market. It is Crawford's highest charting single. On September 20, 1980, the song reached number two on the UK Singles Chart. It also performed well in Belgium (Flanders) and Netherlands, reaching number one in both countries.

Formats and track listings
Germany 7"
"One Day I'll Fly Away" – 4:58
"Blue Flame" – 6:25

Japan 7"
"One Day I'll Fly Away" – 3:40
"Tender Falls the Rain" – 4:13

Netherlands 12"
"One Day I'll Fly Away" – 5:00
"Last Night at Danceland" – 4:53

Charts

Weekly charts

Year-end charts

Nicole Kidman version

In 2001, "One Day I'll Fly Away" was recorded by Nicole Kidman for the motion picture Moulin Rouge!, in which she portrayed the character of Satine. A special remix designed by Tony Phillips has been promoted on single, issued by Interscope on April 5, 2002.

Credits and personnel
 Nicole Kidman - lead vocal
 Joe Sample - writer
 Will Jennings - writer
 Craig Armstrong - producer, arrangement
 Baz Luhrmann - producer
 Anton Monsted - producer
 Josh G Abrahams - producer
 Marius de Vries - producer
 Tony Phillips - remix
 Geoff Foster - remix engineer
 Andy Bradfield - mix
 Simon Franglen - producer/engineer [additional vocal]

Track listings
 CD Single, UK, 497 703-2
 "One Day I'll Fly Away" (Tony Phillips Remix) - 5:11
 "One Day I'll Fly Away" (Original Album Version) - 3:17
 "Your Song" (Instrumental From The Rehearsal Montage Scene) - 2:28

 CD Maxi, Europe, 497 684-2
 "One Day I'll Fly Away" (Tony Phillips Remix) - 5:11
 "One Day I'll Fly Away" (Original Album Version) - 3:17
 "One Day I'll Fly Away" (Instrumental) - 3:16
 "Your Song" (Instrumental From The Rehearsal Montage Scene) - 2:28

 CD Single, Europe, Promo, MOULINCDP4
 "One Day I'll Fly Away" (Tony Phillips Remix - Radio Edit) - 3:42
 "One Day I'll Fly Away" (Original Album Version) - 3:17

 CD Single, US, Promo, INTR 10610-2
 "One Day I'll Fly Away" (Original Album Version) - 3:17

Kimberley Walsh version

Background and release 
Following her solo endeavours and musical theatre performances, Girls Aloud member Kimberley Walsh decided to record a studio album featuring her own renditions of popular hits from musicals, commenting that "I've always loved musical theatre and doing Shrek the Musical definitely reignited the passion in me." For the album, Walsh commented that she wanted "to share the love I have for musical theatre by taking some classic songs and completely reinventing them. The melodies in so many musical songs are so brilliant, I knew we could create something special by experimenting with the production, and I really feel like we've come up with some interesting takes on classic songs." 

On December 21, 2012, "One Day I'll Fly Away" premiered in full through the label's official SoundCloud account. The song was recorded in Stockholm, Sweden and produced by Per Magnusson and David Kreuger. It was officially released on January 4, 2013, as the lead single from Centre Stage through digital download under Decca Records. Along with the album version, the digital release of "One Day I'll Fly Away" includes the Radio Edit and The Alias Club Mix. Peter Robinson of Popjustice compared the latter to Psy's Gangnam Style (2012).

Music video and live performances 
The accompanying music video was directed by Paul Caslin and produced by Amy James through production company JJ Stereo. It was shot in 2K on an Arri Alexa on January 4, 2013, at Pinewood Studios, with 4music publishing behind-the-scenes pictures of the shooting session. The lyric video premiered on January 12, 2013, through VEVO, while the music video premiered on January 17, 2013. It features Walsh performing the song in different settings, until she is joined by Pasha Kovalev and they perform a ballet number. On January 23, 2013, Walsh performed "One Day I'll Fly Away" at the National Television Awards, and on February 2, 2013, at G.A.Y.

Track listing 
Digital download
"One Day I'll Fly Away" – 3:43
"One Day I'll Fly Away" (Radio Edit) – 3:28
"One Day I'll Fly Away" (The Alias Club Mix) – 6:22

Release history

Cover versions and samples
Shirley Bassey released a cover of the song on her 1996 album The Show Must Go On. Dutch symphonic metal band After Forever covered the song and released it on Exordium (2003). Gospel singer Ruben Studdard released a cover as a Wal-Mart-exclusive bonus track on his fourth album, Love Is (2009). The opening bars of "One Day I'll Fly Away" have also appeared on the 2010 Leaving Certificate Music Listening exam in Ireland, as an unprepared Aural Awareness excerpt on Q6. Italian singer Bianca Atzei covered the songs and released it as a single on December 9, 2013.

British soprano Sarah Brightman also covered an operatic version of the song, but it was not included in either CD or digital download until 2015, when her version was included in the first of the 3 volumes of the digital download Rarities (hence her "Test version"). British Electronica trio Vaults covered the song to be the soundtrack featured in the John Lewis 2016 Christmas advertisement.

British Electronica trio Vaults covered the song to be the soundtrack featured in the John Lewis 2016 Christmas advertisement. "One Day I'll Fly Away" is included of the Vaults's debut studio album, Caught in Still Life.

References 

1980 songs
1980 singles
2013 singles
Decca Records singles
Dutch Top 40 number-one singles
Interscope Records singles
Nicole Kidman songs
Songs with lyrics by Will Jennings
Ultratop 50 Singles (Flanders) number-one singles
Virgin EMI Records singles
Warner Records singles
Randy Crawford songs
1980s ballads